The Tagus-Segura Water Transfer (Spanish: Trasvase Tajo-Segura) is one of the largest works of hydraulic engineering ever produced in Spain. Water from the Tagus River is channeled through this transfer system from the reservoirs of Entrepeñas (Province of Guadalajara) and Buendía (Province of Cuenca) into the Talave Reservoir on the Mundo River, a tributary of the Segura River.

History
Although it was mentioned as early as 1902, the origin of the transfer system dates back to 1932, when the Minister of Public Works Indalecio Prieto entrusted engineer  with the formulation of a plan for the management of national water resources. A year later, he presented the Plan Nacional de Obras Hidráulicas (National Plan of Hydraulic Works), which included the Tagus-Segura Water Transfer; however, for various reasons, the plan was never realized.

The transfer system project was resumed through the Ministerial Order of July 30, 1966, which commissioned the drafting of the Anteproyecto General del Aprovechamiento Conjunto de los Recursos Hidráulicos del Centro y Sureste de España, Complejo Tajo-Segura (General Proposal for the Joint Management of Hydraulic Resources in Central and Southeastern Spain, Tagus-Segura System). The construction of the Tagus-Segura Water Transfer formed an integral part of this proposal. In 1979, the Segura Basin received the first waters originating from the Tagus River.

Course
The Tagus-Segura Water Transfer links the Bolarque Reservoir on the Tagus River with the Talave Reservoir on the Segura. The transfer's structure comprises four sections:

Section I includes the ascent at Altomira, a key piece in explaining the energy efficiency of the transfer system. This task is accomplished by the reversible pumped-storage plant Bolarque II, which relies on four vertical generator assemblies with their corresponding Francis pump-turbines, capable of pumping .

Section II connects the Bujeda Reservoir to the Alarcón Reservoir on the Júcar River, an intermediate resting place where the transfer's flow can be regulated and compensation can be made in case of system disruption.

Section III joins the Alarcón Reservoir to the Talave Tunnel.

The course then emerges into the Talave Canal, which leads at last to the Talave Reservoir on the Mundo River, a tributary of the Segura.

Regulation
Law 21/2013 introduced major changes to the Tagus-Segura Water Transfer's regulation policy. These changes, while maintaining the source basin's precedence and respecting the specifications of its resource planning, are meant to improve system management by establishing a set of impartial technical standards to eliminate previous insecurities and to provide objective, straightforward criteria for operation.

Water is dispensed into the transfer system on a monthly basis, depending on the total water supply available in the reservoirs of Entrepeñas and Buendía at the beginning of every month.

Level 1.

Level 2.

Level 3.  Assigned when the total water supply in Entrepeñas and Buendía does not exceed, at the beginning of the month, the values shown in the following table:

Level 4.

To promote the development of riverside communities, priority will be given to the headwater reservoirs for the holding of authorized transfers pending distribution, before the intermediate and terminal basins, as long as this practice conforms to a reasonable and cohesive use of the whole system.

Except in duly confirmed cases of catastrophe or extreme need that disrupt the transfer of water, if the approved volumes outlined in Levels 1 and 2 have not been transferred within the authorized time period, they may still be sent within the three months following the deadline, unless a level change occurs.

Resources authorized for transfer may be used throughout the water year. If any transferred water remains in the receiving basin after the end of the water year, it will be redistributed as an available resource for use in the transfer system during the following water year.

The Central Commission for Exploitation of the Tajo-Segura will be responsible for authorizing transfers when the conditions for Levels 1 and 2 are met, while the ministry with authority concerning water resources, having received the commission's report, will authorize transfers at Level 3.

In regard to Levels 1 and 2, transfer authorization should be granted over six-month terms, while three-month terms are preferred for Level 3 unless the relevant agency should justify the use of different intervals at any level.

Post-transfer system

The Talave Reservoir marks the beginning of the post-transfer system. This is a complex of structures enabling the regulation, transport, and final distribution of water to the various recipient zones. Its principal component is the Ojós Diversion Dam, from which proceed the following: the Blanca elevation, the main canal of the right riverbank, and the Almería Canal; the main canal of the left riverbank and the Crevillente Canal; and La Pedrera Reservoir and the Campo de Cartagena Canal.

According to estimations made by PwC in 2013, the food and agriculture industry linked with the Tagus-Segura Water Transfer brings in a GDP of 2,364 million euros and more than 100,000 jobs, if commercialization and processing activities are included. Despite these figures, the Tagus-Segura Water Transfer has always been the subject of heated debate, having been used from the beginning as a means to criticize the previous Francoist government, under whose authority construction of the transfer began. However, the transfer cannot be considered the work of any one political regime: it was planned during the Second Spanish Republic, built under Franco's dictatorship, and put into service during the Spanish transition to democracy. It still receives much criticism today, mainly for territorial and environmental reasons. With respect to this controversy, Melgarejo et al. observe: "Thirty  years after the commission of the Tagus-Segura Aqueduct, it's hard to understand why its use still hasn't been normalized, and why the distribution of water is still in question."

The official launching of the Tagus-Segura Water Transfer made intensive farming possible in the Spanish southeast, consequently placing the region among the largest European outdoor producers of out-of-season crops. For this reason, it is widely known as the "vegetable garden of Europe."

See also 
 Aqueduct (water supply)
 Hydroelectricity
 Water supply and sanitation in Spain
 List of tunnels in Spain

References

External links 
 Confederación Hidrográfica del Segura (Segura River Basin Authority)

Aqueducts in Spain
Tagus basin
Geography of the Region of Murcia
Geography of the Province of Almería
Interbasin transfer
Irrigation in Spain
Geography of Castilla–La Mancha
Geography of the Province of Alicante
Geography of the Province of Guadalajara
Economy of the Valencian Community
Water supply and sanitation in Castilla-La Mancha